The 1999 Des Moines mayoral election was held on October 5, 1999, to elect the mayor of Des Moines, Iowa. It saw Preston Daniels win reelection.

Results

References 

Des Moines
1999
Des Moines